Show Me the Way to Your Heart may refer to:
"Show Me (The Way to Your Heart)", a song by Bad Boys Blue from the album Heart & Soul
"Show Me the Way to Your Heart", a song by Joe "Bean" Esposito from the album Treated and Released
"Show Me the Way to Your Heart", a song by Ruben and the Jets from the album For Real!
"Show Me the Way to Your Heart", a song by Sara Evans from the album Born to Fly